Carolin Wagner (born 1 October 1982) is a German politician of the Social Democratic Party (SPD) who has been serving as a member of the Bundestag since 2021, representing the Regensburg district.

Early life and education 
Wagner was born 1982 in the West Germany city of Heidelberg and studied German studies.

Political career 
Wagner has been a member of the Bundestag since the 2021 elections. In parliament, she has since been serving on the Committee on Education, Research and Technology Assessment and the Committee on Digital Affairs.

Within her parliamentary group, Wagner is part of a working group on integration and migration, chaired by Lars Castellucci. She also belongs to  Parliamentary Left, a left-wing movement.

Other activities 
 Federal Network Agency for Electricity, Gas, Telecommunications, Post and Railway (BNetzA), Alternate Member of the Advisory Board (since 2022)
 Education and Science Workers' Union (GEW), Member

References 

Living people
Politicians from Heidelberg
1982 births
21st-century German politicians
Members of the Bundestag 2021–2025